Ella Moss is a fashion clothing brand owned by Delta Galil Industries founded by designer Pamella Protzel which is based in Los Angeles.

History  

Pamella Protzel originally attended Pasadena's Art Center studying graphic design, when she decided that fashion was her true passion. She then enrolled at The Fashion Institute of Design and Merchandising in L.A.. Shortly after, Protzel Scott was hired by Moise Emquies, working at his company, Mo Industries. Protzel and Emiquies eventually decided to join forces and create the line Ella Moss, taken from Pamella's nickname (Ella) and Moise's nickname (Moss). They describe the line in three words: "Hip, quirky, fashionable". Protzel explained that her main inspiration for design was art, fashion, people, travelling, and Parisian flea markets.

As of now, the Ella Moss line is worn by Gwyneth Paltrow, Cameron Diaz, Kirsten Dunst, Dianna Agron and Liv Tyler. One of her dresses also appeared on Sarah Jessica Parker in a Sex and the City episode. Protzel described the collection as “flowy femininity with the comfort level of a t-shirt.”. Ella Moss is currently sold at several department stores and boutiques including Barneys New York, Bloomingdales, Nordstrom, Fred Segal and Henri Bendel.

External links 
Official website

Sources 
 https://web.archive.org/web/20081217060035/http://www.ellamoss.com/thestory.html

References 

Clothing brands of the United States
Companies based in Los Angeles